Tzur Hadassah (lit. According to the Central Bureau of Statistics, Tzur Hadassah is the largest settlement in Israel that does not have a local authority status. It falls under the jurisdiction of Mateh Yehuda Regional Council. In 2016, plans for expansion were approved, which would add 15,000 new residents within 5 years.

Schools
Tzur Hadassah is home to 4 primary schools, 1 religious, 1 mixed, and 2 secular.  The religious school is called "Lavi", the mixed (both religious and secular) is "Maayanot", and the secular primary schools are "Hadassim" and Tzurim

Restaurants and Culture
There are two commercial centers in Tzur Hadassah, one near the entrance to the "Har Kitron" neighborhood, housing Burgers Bar, small SuperSol supermarket and Atza Sushi.  The other commercial is on Rechasim street, anchored by the Co-Op Supermarket, and including pizza, New Deli and Shalom Falafel.  In the "Vatika" neighborhood is located the pizzeria Geppeto, brick-oven pizzas and salads.

History
Tzur Hadassah was established in 1956 as a regional centre for nearby moshavim such as (Bar Giora, Mata, Mevo Beitar and Nes Harim) on land that had belonged to the depopulated Palestinian village of Ras Abu 'Ammar. It was named for the Hadassah organization.

The town has four neighborhoods: The "Vatika" (Old Tzur Hadassah and Shehunat HaMeah); New Tzur Hadassah (Shehunat HaEmek);  Sansan (Sansan Mt.); and Har Kitron (Kitron Mt.) which forms the second half of the horseshoe topography of Tzur Hadassah.

The Harei Yehuda riding stable is located in Tzur Hadassah, at the edge of the Sansan nature reserve. It  was established in 1991 in the old part of Tzur Hadassah and moved to new facilities in 2004. The Israel National Trail, marked with orange, blue, and white stripes, reaches Tzur Hadassah on its way westward. In 2014, construction workers discovered a large stalactite cave located beneath parts of Tzur Hadassah, the Parks Service sealed off entrance to the cave system.

Synagogues
Tzur Hadassa is home to Kehilat Shir Chadash (formally Kehilat Tzur Hadassah).
The Kehila has an active chapter of the Israeli Reform Youth Movement “Noar Telem”. The congregation plays a leading role in the town’s social and cultural life. Between 2006-2014 Rabbi Ofer Beit-Halachmi got the congregation into a new building and created a moving voice in the community, leading in projects such as environmental programs, teen programs, and civic engagement such as volunteering in immigrant communities.

See also
Ras Abu 'Ammar

Gallery

References

External links
Official website 

Community settlements
Populated places established in 1960
Populated places in Jerusalem District
1960 establishments in Israel